German submarine U-959 was a Type VIIC U-boat of Nazi Germany's Kriegsmarine during World War II.

She was ordered on 5 June 1941, and was laid down on 21 March 1942 at Blohm & Voss, Hamburg, as yard number 159. She was launched on 3 December 1942 and commissioned under the command of Oberleutnant zur See Martin Duppel on 21 January 1943.

Design
German Type VIIC submarines were preceded by the shorter Type VIIB submarines. U-959 had a displacement of  when at the surface and  while submerged. She had two shafts and two  propellers.

U-959 was fitted with five  torpedo tubes (four fitted at the bow and one at the stern), fourteen torpedoes or 26 TMA mines, one  SK C/35 naval gun, 220 rounds, and one twin  C/30 anti-aircraft gun. The boat had a complement of between 44 — 52 men.

Service history
On 2 May 1944, U-959 was sunk by depth charges, south-east of Jan Mayen Island, in the Norwegian Sea, from a British Swordfish of 842 Squadron/K RNFAA from the escort carrier . Her crew of 53 were all lost.

Wolfpacks
U-959 took part in two wolfpacks, namely:
 Boreas (29 February – 10 March 1944)
 Thor (10 – 15 March 1944)

References

Bibliography

External links

German Type VIIC submarines
U-boats commissioned in 1943
World War II submarines of Germany
Ships built in Hamburg
1942 ships
Maritime incidents in May 1944
World War II shipwrecks in the Norwegian Sea